Brett Michael Wilson (born May 10, 1988) is an American actor/musician from West Hartford, Connecticut.

Early years
Brett began studying at The Hartt School of Music at the age of 7 where he focused on voice, piano and theatre.  At the Hartt School of Music, he was a member of the renowned Connecticut Children's Chorus in 1999, and again in 2000.  He began singing professionally at the age of 8 as a featured soloist and voice-over for Fisher Price.

American Idol 
Brett was seen on Season 5 of American Idol at the age of 16.  He originally auditioned in Boston, MA with Lonestar's "I'm Already There".

Italy Tour  
Brett was chosen to perform during Holy Week at St. Peter's Bascilica in the Vatican for their 2005 Easter Monday Mass.  While in Italy, he also performed at various theatres throughout Rome, Venice, and Florence.

Article 19 
Article 19 formed in May 2008, composed of Brett Michael Wilson (lead vocals, keyboard), Rick Fritsch (guitar, backing vocals), Doug Parkinson (bass, backing vocals), and Jim Townsend (drums).  In 2009, they added Jeff Kenniston (keyboard, backing vocals) who was later replaced by Steve Gregory (lead guitar, backing vocals), followed by Dan Fortin (lead guitar).  Article 19 has shared the bill with the likes of Lady Gaga, Ryan Cabrera, American Idol winner Kris Allen, O.A.R., Flo Rida, and several other national acts.  Their 7-song "Look At Me Now" EP was released in 2008.  Article 19 was under the representation of Unlimited Entertainment's Laura Cretella.  The band was named "Best Pop/Rock" and "Best New Group" by The Hartford Advocate as well as featured on the cover of the magazine in the 2008.  The following year, Article 19 took home "Best Pop/Rock" for a second time.  As frontman, Brett was named "Best Male Vocalist" in 2008 and again in 2009.  The band dismembered in late 2010.

Rob Thomas' "Someday" Music Video 
In 2009, Brett was chosen to be an extra in Rob Thomas' music video for his single "Someday".  The video was filmed on the streets of New York City.

China Tour 
In March 2009, Brett toured China and Hong Kong singing with Central Connecticut's "University Singers" under the direction of Dr. Pam Perry.

National Anthems 
 2008 NASCAR Race (Stafford Springs Racetrack)
 2008 National Motocross Tour (XL Center Arena)
 2008 Central Connecticut State University's Graduation (XL Center Arena)
 2009 Hartford Wolf Pack Season (XL Center Arena)
 2009 WNBA Connecticut Sun Season (Mohegan Sun Arena)
 2009 New Britain Rock Cats Season (New Britain Stadium)
 2009 Central Connecticut State University Graduation (XL Center Arena)
 2009 Riverfest Celebration (Hartford, CT – Main Stage)
 2010 WNBA Connecticut Sun Season (Mohegan Sun Arena)
 2010 Hartford Wolf Pack Season (XL Center Arena)
 2010 Central Connecticut State University's Graduation (XL Center Arena)
 2010 National VISA Gymnastic Competition (XL Center Arena)

New England Megastar 2010 
Brett was named New England Megastar in 2010, beating out 50 other performers.  Winnings included a cash prize and studio time with EastLake Recording Studio's Enoch Jensen.

iSing for St. Jude 2010 
Brett was named winner in August 2010.  He performed Simon and Garfunkel's Grammy award-winning song "Bridge Over Troubled Water" with backing vocalists Marques Ruff, Emily LaRose, and Regina Cormier.  Guest Judges: Sara Welch and Gil Simmons from WTNH TV 8 and Elizabeth Lorenzo, professor of Musicology at Asnuntuck College.  This event raised over $10,000 for St. Jude Children's Hospital.

Musical Theatre 
 Bernardo (West Side Story) – 2001
 Orphan (Oliver!) - 2001
 Officer Pitman (Titanic, The Musical) – 2002
 Don Lockwood (Singin' In The Rain) – 2005
 Frank (Seven Brides for Seven Brothers) – 2006
 Harold Bride (Titanic, The Musical) – 2010
 Roger (RENT) – 2010
 Uncle Ernie (The Who's Tommy) – 2011
 Herb (Godspell) – 2011
 Juan (Altar Boyz) – 2011
 Billy Crocker (Anything Goes) – 2012

In 2011, Brett was nominated for "Best Actor in a Musical" on BroadwayWorld.com for his second run of Titanic, The Musical.  He was nominated again in 2012 for his role of "Billy Crocker" in Anything Goes.

"Brett Michael Wilson as perverted Uncle Ernie is a greasy, twisted loon who would make Keith Moon proud." -Denver Post

The Ellen DeGeneres Show 
Brett was selected by actor/musician Jared Leto to sing back ups for his band Thirty Seconds to Mars in September 2014.  The show was aired on September 23, 2014.

References

Living people
Male actors from Hartford, Connecticut
University of Hartford Hartt School alumni
1988 births
Musicians from Hartford, Connecticut
21st-century American singers
21st-century American male singers